Edwin "Ted" Stratford III (August 8, 1942 – November 29, 2006) was an American football coach. He served as the head football coach at his alma mater, St. Lawrence University in Canton, New York, from 1969 to 1978 and Hamilton College in Clinton, New York from 1979 to 1981, compiling a career college football coaching record of 68–47.

Head coaching record

References

1942 births
2006 deaths
Hamilton Continentals football coaches
St. Lawrence Saints football coaches
St. Lawrence Saints football players
Sportspeople from Holyoke, Massachusetts
Coaches of American football from Massachusetts
Players of American football from Massachusetts